Lala Jaswantrai Churamani (born 25 March 1882) also known as Lala Jaswant Rai, was an activist in the Indian independence movement.

People from Punjab, India
1858 births
1920 deaths
Indian independence activists from Punjab (British India)
Indian National Congress politicians from Punjab, India